Akhand Rural District is in the Central District of Asaluyeh County, Bushehr province, Iran. At the censuses of 2006 and 2011, its constituent parts were in the former Asaluyeh District of Kangan County. The rural district's establishment within the Central District of the new county was officially announced on 12 December 2012. At the most recent census of 2016, the population of the rural district was 10,385 in 1,764 households. The largest of its six villages was Akhand, with 6,775 people.

References 

Rural Districts of Bushehr Province
Populated places in Asaluyeh County